Yugoslavian ferry ship Niš sank on 9 September 1952, on the Danube river between Belgrade and Zemun. As a result of a freak storm above the mouth of the Sava into the Danube, at least 127 people were killed, but the exact number of fatalities remains unknown. It was the deadliest ship accident in the history of Serbia, either military or civilian, and the deadliest river accident in the history of Yugoslavia. The shipwreck has been labeled as the "Danubian Titanic".

Introduction 

The passenger ferries Zagreb and Niš operated on the ferry line Zemun-Belgrade, across the rivers of Danube and Sava. As Belgrade had no motorway bridges across the Sava at that time, the line was basically part of the urban city transport. It usually took 20 minutes to reach the other port. In 1952 the construction of the Branko's Bridge, on the pillars of the pre-World War II King Alexander Bridge which was destroyed, was underway. It was open for the pedestrians, though, but on 9 September 1952, it was closed even for them, due to some works. This resulted in major crowds on the Sava Port that day.

Both ferries were designed for 60 passengers, but they regularly transported twice larger number of people. The Niš was scheduled to go to the Zemun port at 13:30. Captain of the ship, Ferdinand Nobilo, seeing that the deck was already crowded with passengers, asked the permission from the port authority to sail out earlier. He was given a go so the ship sailed out on 13:07.

Disaster 

The day was sunny and warm. After noon, the clouds began to amass over the Zemun area, but neither the crew nor the clerks at the port authority were worried about it. When leaving the dock, the ship scratched a bit on it. Soon, an unusual weather phenomenon began to develop. The passengers who were on the deck, cramped belowdecks to protect themselves from the storm. The thunders were so loud that it appeared as bomb detonations.

Captain Nobilo ordered Jovan Gvozdić, the helmsman, to take the ferry closer to the bank, but it was too late for maneuvering. A massive wave slammed to door of the passenger compartment, opening them. At 13:12, the side blow of the hurricane-strong wind tipped the ship on its side. Passengers ran to the opposite side, but they began to slide and fall down in an effort to climb the benches or exit through the ventilation holes. The water poured inside and those who were belowdecks remained trapped. The crew members, including captain Nobilo and engine operator Dušan Jovanović, began smashing the windows and breaking the hull plates in order to make holes for escaping the entombing ship. They broke the doors of the compartments, dragging passengers out. They were also breaking and cracking wooden beams and planks from the ship's interior, throwing them into the water so that survivors would have something to hang on to. The passengers were overwhelmed by the panic.

The fog was so heavy, that the ship was barely visible from the bank, even though it wasn't far away from it. Siren from the ship was heard at one moment with speedy but irregular sound, signaling for help, but it soon stopped. It sank on the location between the Nebojša Tower and the Great War Island. According to the eyewitnesses, the "desperate screams" were heard coming from the river.

Those who managed to escape to the surface of the water, were battered by the storm. The hail began to fall with the hailstones the size of a chicken egg. It literally smashed heads of the survivors, who would turn unconscious and then taken away and drowned by the strong waves. Survivors stated that people would scream and just disappear below the water after being hit. The others ended up being severely bruised. Almost at instant, just like it started, the storm stopped and the sun appeared.

Rescue operation 

Even during the storm, local boatmen with their small boats and dinghies came to the rescue, but were hindered by the weather. Medical crews from the Military Medical Academy arrived only at 15:00, so as Aleksandar Ranković and Slobodan Penezić Krcun, ministers of the interior of Yugoslavia and Serbia, respectively, and Serbian minister Jovan Veselinov. 10 boats sailed out while some of the boat owners on the bank in front of the Nebojša Tower were throwing cables and grapnels into the water, dragging out the survivors who would grab on the cords. As some boatmen lived on the bank, their family members were the first to take in the survivors, trying to keep them warm. A group of soldiers also helped taking the survivors ashore.

In the afternoon, the salvage operation began. Diver Bogoljub Perić was the first to examine the wreck at the bottom of the river. In one, out of two compartments for passengers, he numbered 56 bodies. They included one crew member who was still grasping onto the mast, and 7 children. By the 7:30 in the morning of 10 September, all bodies from the wreckage were retrieved. The Niš was lifted from the riverbed by the Soča floating elevator, which dragged it to the bank. The lifting of the ship was hampered with various difficulties, but the Soča finished the raising of the Niš at 04:00 on the 11 September. The ship was in an upward position, as if its still sailing, and oddly, wasn't much damaged.

Fatalities 

The police initially reported 90 dead. The number included 3 out of 6 crew members. But in the days to come, bodies of the drowned passengers were being retrieved from the locations downstream the Danube: Pančevo Bridge, banks at Vinča, Ritopek, etc. The number of dead bodies grew to 126 or 127, however the exact number is still unknown.

The number of boarded passengers was unknown, to begin with. The Niš was planned for 60 passengers, but for that specific ride 106 tickets were sold. However, in addition to this number, there were the passengers who had daily and monthly tickets, and children and pupils who didn't pay for the ticket at all. In addition, 30 passengers and crew members survived the sinking, which mean there were some 160 passengers on board. Witnesses at the Nebojša Tower estimated that they observed some 60 "heads" in the water, meaning that at least half of them still didn't survive, despite reaching the surface of the water.

Investigation 

Captain Nobilo survived the accident. Due to the conflicting statements from the survivors, he spent some time in custody, but was let go and was never charged. Nobilo stated that he asked the permission to sail out earlier because the ship was already overcrowded while people kept arriving to the port wanting to board, and that he was given the permission from the port authority. He added that all the attempts to place the bow against the wind failed once the ship abruptly leaned on the starboard side. The wind was stronger than the stern and the ship sank in several moments.

A state commission was formed to investigate the matter. The commission concluded that the sudden surge of the hurricane-strong wind was the only cause of the tragedy and that no individual should be blamed. It was an unusual conclusion: in an atheist, Communist country, force majeure was blamed.

Experts later stated that there was a fatal circumstance which aggravated the situation and accelerated the demise of the ship. Just few days before the shipwreck, Yugoslav River Shipping Company modernized the ferry. The bulky and heavy steam engine was replaced with the much lighter diesel one. This caused a major imbalance and allowed for the ship to tip over so easily. The commission didn't discuss this possibility. Another possible reason was a fact that the river was dredged recently, which deepened the riverbed, allowing the creation of vortex.

Meteorology 

The freak storm like this was not recorded in Belgrade. It was so concentrated on the rivers, as opposed to the land, that many Belgraders didn't believe at first that a disaster of this magnitude happened, thinking that the reports are exaggerated. It set the record when it comes to the precipitation in these areas.

Aftermath 

News about the disaster were internationally reported. The government of Yugoslavia declared three days of national mourning and promised state help for the children who lost parents and families who lost breadwinners. The State Insurance Institution announced that all passengers were insured and that for each dead they will pay 50,000 dinars and for survived but left with full disability, 100,000 dinars.

The only two daily newsparers in Belgrade at the time, Politika and Borba did report about the disaster, in generally correct and thoughtful manner, however, despite the magnitude of the accident, none published the news on the front page. At that time, 10 year anniversary of the Yugoslav War Navy was celebrated, so it would be impractical to publish two such news side by side. Still relatively new Communist government suppressed the news about the accident as much as possible as the setbacks and failures were to be overlooked in general. Politika in its 10 September issue had a statement from the captain Nobilo, while on the 12th it published statements from the witnesses. Borba, in its 11 September issue gave detailed timetable of what happened after the sinking and the salvage  mission which ensued. In the next several days, the reports of the accident were mixed with the "successes": lighting up of the coke furnaces in Lukavac, Bosnia and Herzegovina, establishing of the regular traffic on the Belgrade-Zagreb highway and even the "great philatelist exhibition in Belgrade".

As a result of such policy ("dictatorship of optimism"), the event initially spawned numerous conspiracy theories and fairytale stories, but ultimately the tragedy was left to the collective oblivion. As of 2018 there is no memorial of any kind marking the event. Also, it didn't find its place in the art, except for the fictional 2014 novel Shipwreck (Brodolom) by Vlada Arsić.

Immediately after the accident, the stories began circulating through the city about what happened. The accent was especially on the weird circumstances of the storm, which above the land wasn't nearly as strong as it was above the rivers, either in Belgrade or Zemun. Enhanced by gossiping, it appeared that the "heavenly forces" struck only "the Niš and its passengers" and several urban myths about the fates of the passengers developed.

Stories from that period, some of which were published later in the newspapers as witness' statements, include the case of Dragoljub Jovanović from Zemun. He became father that morning and decided to go to Belgrade to buy some presents, but perished in return. Marija Dimitrijević was drowned with her two daughters, while the third survived as Dimitrijević left her with a friend in the Sava port, because the ferry was overcrowded. Ljubiša Petrović, though he couldn't swim, managed to float on the surface holding onto a plank and was rescued. A young mother who left the maternity hospital that morning, was found deep inside the ship clutching baby in her arms. Ana Bajzert, a worker in the "Sutjeska" textile factory, couldn't swim but the waves pushed her ashore alive while her 12-years old daughter drowned. Airforce major reached the bank swimming with one hand, while holding someone else's child under his other arm believing he is saving his son, while his wife and son drowned inside the ship. One girl managed to swim to the bank and abruptly died at spot.

One of the survivors was a 17-year old , later a popular actress. With several other survivors, she participated in the commemoration in 2002, marking the 50th anniversary of the accident. They put flower garlands in the river, on the location of the accident.

Later developments 

The ship was then repaired and renamed "Senta". For the next several years it ferried the Smederevo–Kovin line, across the Danube, east of Belgrade. In the late 1970s the ship was decommissioned and scrapped in the Pančevo's Brodoremont company.

One of the urban legends surrounding the ship itself is that, as of 2010, painted in black and with floats on sides, it still sailed as a passenger ferry, connecting Novi Sad's Štrand beach with Sremska Kamenica, across the Danube.

References 

Maritime incidents in 1952
Transport disasters in Serbia
1952 in Yugoslavia
20th-century disasters in Serbia
Man-made disasters in Yugoslavia